Snell may refer to:

People and fictional characters
Snell (surname), list of people and fictional characters with the surname
Snell (given name), list of people with the name

Geography

United States
Snell, Virginia, an unincorporated community
Snell, Wisconsin, an unincorporated community
Snell Creek, California
Snell Valley, California

Antarctica
Mount Snell

Other uses
Snell Acoustics, a manufacturer of audio equipment
Snell Limited, a manufacturer of digital media products
Snell Memorial Foundation, an organization which provides standard of safety for helmets
Snell knot, a hitch knot used to attach an eyed fishing hook to fishing line
Snell station, a light rail station in San Jose, California

See also
Snelle (born 1995), Dutch rapper and singer
Snell's law, the law of refraction in optics, named after Willebrord Snell
Snell Arcade, a historic site in St. Petersburg, Florida, United States
Snells, Wisconsin, United States, an unincorporated community